Vdara is a condo-hotel and spa within the CityCenter complex, located on the Las Vegas Strip in Paradise, Nevada. It was designed by Rafael Viñoly, and is located across from CityCenter's Aria Resort & Casino. Vdara opened on December 2, 2009 as a joint venture between MGM Resorts International and Dubai World. In 2021, MGM bought out Dubai World and sold Vdara to The Blackstone Group, while remaining as operator.

Vdara's 57-story tower houses 1,495 suites. The non-gaming property also includes a two-floor spa, meeting space, a pool deck, a market cafe, and a bar. A design problem was discovered in 2008, when it was learned that the hotel's reflective surface and concave design can act as a parabolic reflector that creates conditions of extremely high temperature at the pool deck.

History
Vdara was announced in October 2006, as part of the CityCenter project by MGM. It was designed by Rafael Viñoly. The name "Vdara" is made up. It was coined by Rafael Viñoly Architects, taking its "V" from "Vegas" and "ara" from boutique hotels in California such as Park Hyatt Resort Aviara and Ritz-Carlton Bacara. On May 14, 2008, Vdara became the first of the CityCenter towers to be topped off. Vdara opened to invited guests and media on December 1, 2009. The public opening occurred the following day, making it the first component of CityCenter to open.

For its environmentally friendly design, Vdara was designated as a LEED Gold building prior to its opening, and received a five-key rating from Green Key Global in 2010.

In 2021, MGM bought out its CityCenter partner, Dubai World, gaining full ownership of the Vdara hotel and Aria. That same year, MGM sold both properties for $3.89 billion in cash to The Blackstone Group, which leased them back to MGM for an annual rent of $215 million.

Features
Vdara is a non-gaming and non-smoking hotel.

The property originated as a condo hotel, giving owners the option to participate in a rental program to lease their condos as hotel rooms when they are not residing there. However, due to poor economic conditions brought on by the Great Recession, MGM converted 1,350 units into regular hotel rooms, leaving approximately 150 as residential units. Condo closings began in March 2010.

Artwork is incorporated into Vdara's interior and exterior design. Nancy Rubin's  sculpture Big Edge, made of various boats, is displayed outside the entrance of the hotel. It features approximately 200 canoes, catamarans, kayaks, paddle boats, rowboats, and surfboards held together with stainless steel wire cable. The sculpture is meant to resemble a blooming flower. A large painting by Frank Stella hangs above the registration desk in the lobby.

Vdara includes an  two-story spa and salon, and a  pool area. Abbey Beach, a dayclub pool event targeted at a gay clientele, operated during 2010. The Bellagio resort, located directly north of Vdara, connects to the hotel via a covered walkway.

It was designed by Karim Rashid. Market Cafe Vdara, a small grocery store also serving sandwiches and pastries, opened in March 2011. Silk Road closed simultaneously, due to lack of demand. In 2013, part of the former restaurant was converted into meeting and event space, with a Starbucks taking up the remainder. Two years later, Vdara opened a bar, Vice Versa, in its lobby. It serves food, and includes indoor and outdoor seating which overlooks CityCenter.

In 2017, Vdara debuted autonomous robots capable of delivering certain room-service items.

Solar convergence
In 2010, it was established that the tower's south side, with its reflective surface and concave design, can act as a collecting mirror. The reflected rays of the sun create dangerous conditions of extremely high temperature at the pool deck. Hotel employees and news outlets referred to the phenomenon as the "death ray," while management preferred the term "solar convergence".

MGM and contractors became aware of the problem in 2008. Vdara management considered various solutions but the challenge in overcoming the structural design problem is that the sun and its reflection are targets that constantly move during the day and as every season progresses. Management installed large blue umbrellas over the pool deck to protect bathers, while the hotel's glass exterior has been covered with non-reflective film.

Viñoly also designed the "Walkie-Talkie" skyscraper in London, opened in 2014, which has been dubbed the "Walkie-Scorchie" and "Fryscraper" due to a similar, sun-reflecting and scorching problem.

Gallery

See also
 List of tallest buildings in Las Vegas

References

External links

 

2009 establishments in Nevada
Leadership in Energy and Environmental Design gold certified buildings
Hotel buildings completed in 2009
Hotels established in 2009
Las Vegas Strip
MGM Resorts International
Residential buildings in the Las Vegas metropolitan area
Skyscraper hotels in Paradise, Nevada
2021 mergers and acquisitions